Escondido Village at Valley and Ash in Escondido, California, now a suburb of San Diego, was the first enclosed, and first fully air-conditioned shopping mall in California, opening on March 9, 1964, costing $10 million to build. It was advertised as a shopping center with an "enclosed sidewalk" or "an air-conditioned sidewalk and mall", as the term "mall" was not yet synonymous with an enclosed shopping center, but rather its original meaning of a long, planted or green space. Walker Scott, the San Diego-based department store chain was an anchor, as was Mayfair Markets, TG&Y discount stores joining later. Sears joined later as the second department store anchor with

Walker Scott Escondido
The  Walker Scott store, the chain's fifth, cost $3,750,000, and officially opened with a ribbon-cutting at 11 A.M. on Monday, April 6, 1964. The store had numerous notable design features. The design was by Brand-Worth & Associates. Walls, floors and fixtures were color coordinated. The signage was custom-made in classic raised Roman alphabet.

Carpet
The store featured a specially-made multi-color carpet in eight related shades around the perimeter of the store, in a progressive spectrum from red to blue. The men's department carpet was dark blue, the dress department reds and purples, the juniors and lingerie departments pink and orchid colors, and in ladies' sportswear, vermilion and lavender.

Walls
The store had wall murals in classic Roman themes by Rick Chase, a Southern California muralist. Other walls were covered in metal sculptures, including acid-etched brass trees in recesses in the walls of the apparel areas. In the sportswear department, three sculptured metal trees were made with more than 9,000 stylized leaves. Decorative grill work enclosed the glass well of the escalators.

Anchor changes
(now The Home Depot).

Transformation to strip-style center
The mall was transformed into an unenclosed strip-style neighborhood shopping center in 1991 to try and compete after losing business to North County Fair which opened in 1986.

References

Shopping malls in San Diego County, California
Demolished shopping malls in the United States